The 2005 Fed Cup was the 43rd edition of the most important competition between national teams in women's tennis.

The final took place at Court Philippe Chatrier in Paris, France, on 17–18 September. The home team, France, lost to Russia, 2–3, giving Russia their second title, consecutively and overall, and their second win against France in a final.

World Group

Draw

World Group play-offs

The four losing teams in the World Group first round ties (Argentina, Austria, Belgium and Italy), and four winners of the World Group II ties (Croatia, Czech Republic, Germany and Switzerland) entered the draw for the World Group play-offs.

Date: 9–10 July

World Group II

The World Group II was the second highest level of Fed Cup competition in 2005. Winners advanced to the World Group play-offs, and losers played in the World Group II play-offs.

Date: 23–24 April

World Group II play-offs

The four losing teams from World Group II (Indonesia, Japan, Slovakia and Thailand) played off against qualifiers from Zonal Group I. Two teams qualified from Europe/Africa Zone (Bulgaria and Slovenia), one team from the Asia/Oceania Zone (China), and one team from the Americas Zone (Puerto Rico).

Date: 9–10 July

Americas Zone

 Nations in bold advanced to the higher level of competition.
 Nations in italics were relegated down to a lower level of competition.

Group I
Venue: Carrasco Lawn Tennis Club, Montevideo, Uruguay (outdoor clay)

Dates: 20–23 April

Participating Teams

Group II
Venue: Liga de Tenis de Campo de Antioquia, Medellín, Colombia (outdoor clay)

Dates: 21–23 April

Participating Teams

Asia/Oceania Zone

 Nations in bold advanced to the higher level of competition.
 Nations in italics were relegated down to a lower level of competition.

Group I
Venue: R.K. Khanna Tennis Complex, New Delhi, India (outdoor hard)

Dates: 20–23 April

Participating Teams

Group II
Venue: R.K. Khanna Tennis Complex, New Delhi, India (outdoor hard)

Dates: 19–21 April

Participating Teams

Europe/Africa Zone

 Nations in bold advanced to the higher level of competition.
 Nations in italics were relegated down to a lower level of competition.

Group I
Venue: Club Ali Bey, Manavgat, Antalya, Turkey (outdoor clay)

Dates: 20–23 April

Participating Teams

Group II
Venue: Club Ali Bey, Manavgat, Antalya, Turkey (outdoor hard)

Dates: 27–30 April

Participating Teams

Group III
Venue: Club Ali Bey, Manavgat, Antalya, Turkey (outdoor clay)

Dates: 28–30 April

Participating Teams

Rankings
The rankings were measured after the three points during the year that play took place, and were collated by combining points earned from the previous four years.

References

External links 
 Fed Cup

 
Billie Jean King Cups by year
Fed
2005 in women's tennis